The South Cheatham Advocate is a weekly newspaper published in Kingston Springs, Tennessee since 1990.

The South Cheatham Advocate has been, throughout its existence, an advertiser-supported, free newspaper.  It is not, however, a "shopper"; it has considerable editorial content and coverage of area events in the area of southern Cheatham County, particularly Kingston Springs and Pegram.  In its early existence, it was also fairly widely circulated in the nearby town of White Bluff in Dickson County; this was curtailed when a major White Bluff advertiser ceased its support.  At this time, the paper assumed its current name, the South Cheatham Advocate; it had previously been circulated as The Advocate, a name more widely associated with a national gay-oriented publication.  When circulation in White Bluff resumed on a limited scale, the South Cheatham portion of the name was retained.

External links
 Paper's web site

Weekly newspapers published in the United States
Newspapers published in Tennessee
Cheatham County, Tennessee
Publications established in 1990
1990 establishments in Tennessee